Artificial disintegration is the term coined by Ernest Rutherford for the process by which an atomic nucleus is broken down by bombarding it with high speed alpha particles, either from a particle accelerator, or a naturally decaying radioactive substance such as radium, as Rutherford originally used.

See also
 Nuclear fission
 The Fly in the Cathedral

References

Nuclear physics
Ernest Rutherford